Faith in Chaos (Book of Revelations) is the third album by American hip hop group Insane Poetry.

Reception

Track listing

References

2003 albums
Insane Poetry albums
Self-released albums
Horrorcore albums